Knud John Peter Wadum Jensen (7 December 1916 - 12 December 2000) was the founder of the Louisiana Museum of Modern Art in Denmark.

Life 

Between 1936 and 1938, Knud W. Jensen studied language and commerce in Germany, Switzerland, France, Belgium, and the United Kingdom before he joined his father's company, Ost en gros, in 1939.

References

Danish art collectors
1916 births
2000 deaths